Nenad Rajić (born 28 December 1982) is a Serbian footballer.

Honours
Diósgyőr
Hungarian League Cup (1): 2013–14

References

External links
 
 MLSZ 
 Profile at Official FFU Website (Ukr)

1982 births
Living people
Footballers from Novi Sad
Serbian footballers
Association football goalkeepers
FK Budućnost Banatski Dvor players
FK Spartak Subotica players
FK Srem players
Alki Larnaca FC players
Cypriot First Division players
FK Leotar players
Diósgyőri VTK players
Nemzeti Bajnokság I players
Serbian expatriate footballers
Expatriate footballers in Cyprus
Expatriate footballers in Bosnia and Herzegovina
Expatriate footballers in Hungary
Serbian expatriate sportspeople in Cyprus
Serbian expatriate sportspeople in Bosnia and Herzegovina
Serbian expatriate sportspeople in Hungary
FK Moravac Mrštane players